VirtueMart (formerly known as mambo-phpShop) is an open-source e-commerce solution designed as an extension of the Mambo or Joomla! content management systems (CMS). VirtueMart is written in PHP and requires the MySQL database environment for storage. It is best suited for low to medium level traffic web-sites.

History
VirtueMart began as offshoot of the stand-alone phpShop e-commerce web application. Originally dubbed mambo-phpShop it became the first substantial native e-commerce component for the Mambo CMS system. After the community forked Mambo into Joomla, the developer re-branded mambo-phpShop as VirtueMart, officially supporting the newer Joomla CMS. While current implementations may still function with Mambo CMS, and older editions of mambo-phpShop are still available to download, they are no longer actively supported.

Originally developed by Sören Eberhardt-Biermann, in September 2009 a new team began developing VirtueMart 2. The new version was released in December 2011. In October 2012 the developer team declared end of life for VirtueMart 1.1 and since then VirtueMart 2 is no longer maintaining Joomla 1.5 compatibility.

Features
VirtueMart supports an unlimited number of products and categories, with products assignable to multiple categories. Until version 3, it permitted the sale of downloadable products. That functionality is now mostly supported by separate, subscription plugins. It offers a catalog mode where the shopping cart features are turned off. VirtueMart supports multiple prices for a single product, based around shopper groups or a quantity range, and permits the use of a variety of different payment gateways.

Because VirtueMart is an open-source e-commerce solution all the application code is openly visible in PHP. This allows PHP developers to view, update or customize the operation of the shopping cart. In addition VirtueMart itself offers simplified templates (called 'fly pages' in VirtueMart) structure that allows various shopping and cart page(s) to be edited as standard HTML and CSS.

Notably new to VirtueMart 1.1.0 was the inclusion of the ability quickly to change themes for category, product, checkout and cart pages. The cart is also integrated with Rapid 3.0, which enables transaction data to be sent directly from the customer's browser to the payment gateway without passing through the merchant's systems.

Virtuemart is supported by an iPhone app by iVMStore.

Usage
VirtueMart has been adopted by over 269,000 online retailers.

For the week of Sep 23rd 2013, Quantcast data collated by BuiltWith Trends indicated that VirtueMart ran on 1.47% of the top 10K sites, 3.25% of the top 100K sites, and 6.02% of the top million sites.

Requirements
As VirtueMart is only a plugin for Joomla! / Mambo, it has the same system requirements.

Several other required supporting libraries or extensions include MySQL, XML and Zlib support built into PHP. Support for HTTPS (OpenSSL) and cURL is recommended.

Compatibility 
 VirtueMart 1.1.x is compatible with Joomla 1.5.x.
 VirtueMart 2.0.x is compatible with Joomla 2.5.x.
 VirtueMart 2.6.x is compatible with Joomla 2.5.x.
 VirtueMart 2.9.x is compatible with Joomla 3.x.
 VirtueMart 3.0.x is compatible with Joomla 2.5.x and Joomla 3.x.

Further reading
VirtueMart 1.x.x
 Michelle M. Griffin, Website Design Guide to Joomla! 1.5, Virtuemart & Extensions, CorporationGURU (2008), 
 
 Joseph Kwan, Joomla! VirtueMart 1.1 Theme and Template Design, PACKT PUBLISHING (2011), 
 Götz Nemeth: VirtueMart  Der Joomla!-Shop (German), Franzis Verlag (2010), 
 Martin Blasczyk: Das offizielle VirtueMart-Buch: Online-Shops aufbauen und betreiben mit Joomla! (German), Addison-Wesley (2009), 
 Valérie Isaksen, Thierry Tardif, Joomla et VirtueMart: Réussir sa boutique en ligne (French), Eyrolles (2008/2009), 
 Jean-Noël Anderruthy: Joomla ! 1.5: Créez un site web et une boutique en ligne avec VirtueMart, 2 volumes (French), Editions ENI (2010), 
 Roberto Chimenti: Crea il tuo e-commerce con Joomla! & Virtuemart (Italian), Hoepli (2010), 
 G.J. Fierloos: MyStudy Virtuemart (Dutch), Duuren Media, Van (2008), 

VirtueMart 2.x.x
 Kerry W. Watson: Showme Guides Virtuemart 2 User Manual, CreateSpace (2012), 
 Nemeth Götz: VirtueMart 2 (German), Franzis Verlag (2012), 
 Martin Blasczyk: Das offizielle VirtueMart-Buch: Online-Shops aufbauen und betreiben mit Joomla! (German), Addison-Wesley (Sep. 2012) 
 Sasa Paporovic: VirtueMart 2.x - Der Grundkurs[Video-Tutorial](German), CreateSpace Independent Publishing Platform (2014) ASIN B00IRLHS5Y
 Valérie Isaksen, Thierry Tardif: Réussir sa boutique en ligne - Joomla! 2.5 et VirtueMart 2 (French), Eyrolles (Sep. 2012),

See also

 Comparison of shopping cart software
 List of online payment service providers

References

Free e-commerce software
Joomla extensions